Dorstenia setosa is a plant species in the family Moraceae which is native to eastern Brazil.

References

setosa
Plants described in 1841
Flora of Brazil